Gormanville is a community in the Canadian province of Nova Scotia, located in the Municipal District of East Hants in Hants County .  The same families of Ulster Scots people, the Densmores (arrived 1811) and O'Briens (arrived 1821), who had earlier settled Noel, Nova Scotia were the first to settle the area. The community was named much later after Matthew Gorman (1884). His two sons died young at age 22 and 27 and are buried in the Saint Francis Xavier Roman Catholic Cemetery, in Maitland, Hants County, Nova Scotia.

References

 Gormanville on Destination Nova Scotia

Communities in Hants County, Nova Scotia
General Service Areas in Nova Scotia